"It Started All Over Again" is a song written by Gerry Goffin and Jack Keller and performed by Brenda Lee.  The song reached #15 in the UK and #29 on the Billboard Hot 100 in 1962.  The song also reached #37 in Australia.

References

1962 songs
1962 singles
Songs with lyrics by Gerry Goffin
Songs written by Jack Keller (songwriter)
Brenda Lee songs
Decca Records singles